Sir Abdullah bin Khalifa Al-Said,   (13 February 1911 – 1 July 1963), was the 10th Sultan of Zanzibar after the death of his father, Sir Khalifa bin Harub, who died on 9 October 1960 at age eighty-one. He was less popular than his father and had a rough reign as Sultan, as at the time of his death both his legs had been amputated.

U.S. President John F. Kennedy had Galt & Bro, a Washington D.C. based jeweler, make a gold plaque as a gift for the Sultan; however, it was never picked up from the jeweler following the  assassination of the President in 1963.

He ruled Zanzibar from 9 October 1960 to 1 July 1963. On his death, he was succeeded as Sultan by his son Jamshid.

Honours
King George V Silver Jubilee Medal-1935
Companion of the Order of St Michael and St George (CMG)-1936
Order of the Brilliant Star of Zanzibar, 1st Class-(1936–1960, then Sovereign to 1963)
Sultan Khalifa II Silver Jubilee Medal-1937
King George VI Coronation Medal-1937
Queen Elizabeth II Coronation Medal-1953
Knight Commander of the Order of the British Empire (KBE)-1959

Children 
 Sultan Sayyid Jamshid Bin Abdullah Bin Khalifa Bin Harub.
 Sayyida Sughiya Bint Abdullah Bin Khalifa Bin Harub.
 Sayyida Sindiya Bint Abdullah Bin Khalifa Bin Harub.
 Sayyid Mohammed Bin Abdullah Bin Khalifa Bin Harub.
 Sayyida Shariffa Bint Abdullah Bin Khalifa Bin Harub.
 Sayyid Harub Bin Abdullah Bin Khalifa Bin Harub.

Ancestry

References

1911 births
1963 deaths
Al Said dynasty
Sultans of Zanzibar
Honorary Knights Commander of the Order of the British Empire
Companions of the Order of St Michael and St George
Zanzibari royalty
20th-century Arabs
20th-century Omani people